William Kendall Richardson (10 February 1880 – 10 July 1903) was an Australian rules footballer who played for the St Kilda Football Club in the Victorian Football League (VFL).

He died from consumption in July 1903 at the age of 23.

Notes

External links 

1880 births
1903 deaths
Australian rules footballers from Victoria (Australia)
St Kilda Football Club players
20th-century deaths from tuberculosis
Tuberculosis deaths in Victoria (Australia)